Fimbristylis cardiocarpa is a sedge of the family Cyperaceae that is native to Australia.

It blooms between February and July and produces green-brown flowers.

In Western Australia it is found in the Kimberley region where it grows in gravelly lateritic red clay soils around sandstone.

References

Plants described in 1859
Flora of Western Australia
cardiocarpa
Taxa named by Ferdinand von Mueller